This article lists the provinces of South Africa by their average life expectancy at birth according to data by Statistics South Africa.

Males

Females

See also
 List of African countries by life expectancy

References 

Health in South Africa
Life expectancy
South African provinces by life expectancy
South Africa